This was the first edition of the tournament since 2009.

Eduardo Struvay won the title, defeating Peđa Krstin 4–6, 6–4, 6–4 in the final.

Seeds

Draw

Finals

Top half

Bottom half

References
 Main Draw
 Qualifying Draw

Abierto de Puebla - Singles
Challenger Britania Zavaleta
Mex